The British Rail Class 119 DMUs were used throughout the Western Region and on services in the Midlands sourced by Tyseley Depot. Built by the Gloucester Railway Carriage & Wagon Co. Ltd, the body design was based on the Swindon Cross-Country sets, but with a Derby cab.  Sets were normally formed of three cars.

History
Shortly after their introduction, some sets were transferred from Cardiff to serve the intermediate stations on outer suburban services from London Paddington to Oxford. These were as 7-car sets, with the addition of Hawksworth composites adapted to run as DMU trailers.

Sets worked over most of the Western Region, notable early use being the last passenger train over the Plympton branch. Minehead, Calne and Bridport branches that have since closed were also served by the sets, which also covered main line services in company with the Swindon Cross Country sets.

As with most asbestos-contaminated stock, there were heavy withdrawals, but a number were rebuilt internally after asbestos removal. The rebuilt sets were frequently used on express services from Reading to Gatwick Airport along the Reading-Gatwick link and on stopping services to Tonbridge.  Units stabled at Redhill Station overnight would find themselves being fuelled at Selhust Depot, working parcels services to London Bridge and at Clapham Junction working the early morning service to Kensington Olympia.

The fleet was displaced by the 'Turbo' Class 165 and Class 166 fleets in 1992.

Orders

Accidents and incidents
On 1 August 1990, unit L576 collided with a passenger train comprising 4VEP electric multiple units 3508 & 3504, and 4CIG unit 1304 at  due to overrunning signals. Forty people were injured.

Preservation
51073  (DMBC) Ecclesbourne Valley Railway 
51074  (DMBC) Swindon and Cricklade Railway
51104  (DMSL) Swindon and Cricklade Railway
2 vehicles are currently undergoing restoration on the Swindon and Cricklade Railway (updated 14/6/12), now in service (09/05/19). 1 vehicle has recently been restored on the Ecclesbourne Valley Railway (updated 25/08/13).

References

Further reading

External links

 The Railcar Association - Class 119
 The Railcar Association - Class 119 photo gallery
 Ecclesbourne Valley Railway - Class 119 W51073 Restoration Diary

119
Gloucester multiple units
Train-related introductions in 1958